Divales is a genus of beetles belonging to the family Melyridae.

List of species
 Divales bipustulatus (Fabricius, 1781)
 Divales cinctus (Gené, 1839)
 Divales communimacula (Costa, 1847)
 Divales haemorrhoidalis (Fabricius, 1798)
 Divales mauritanicus (Lucas, 1849)
 Divales quadrimaculatus (Olivier, 1790)
 Divales uhligi Majer, 1984
 Divales weisei Schilsky, 1894

References

 Biolib

Melyridae
Cleroidea genera